The Joint multichannel trunking and switching system is that composite multichannel trunking and switching system formed from assets of the Services, the Defense Communications System, other available systems, and/or assets controlled by the Joint Chiefs of Staff to provide an operationally responsive, survivable communication system, preferably in a mobile/transportable/recoverable configuration, for the joint force commander in an area of operations.

References

Military communications